Raisman is a surname. Notable people with the surname include:

Jeremy Raisman (1892–1978), British administrator in India and banker
Geoffrey Raisman (1939–2017), British neuroscientist
Aly Raisman (born 1994), American artistic gymnast

See also
Raisman Program, a series of economic reforms, named after Jeremy Raisman, established by Pakistan in 1951
Raizman
Roisman